Misfits is a Barbershop quartet that won the 1945 SPEBSQSA international competition.

References
 AIC entry (archived)

Barbershop quartets
Barbershop Harmony Society